The Polans or Polians (Poliany,  Polyane), also Polanians or Polianians, were an East Slavic tribe between the 6th and the 9th century, which inhabited both sides of the Dnieper river from Liubech to Rodnia and also down the lower streams of the rivers Ros', Sula, Stuhna, Teteriv, Irpin', Desna and Pripyat.

The distinct western Polans of the Early Middle Ages were a West Slavic tribe, ancestors of the Poles.

History
The name derives from the Old East Slavic word поле, which means "field", because, according to the Primary Chronicle they lived in the fields. In roughly 862 the Polans were attached to Kievan Rus'.

According Vikentiy Khvoyka, the Polanians were most likely descended from the Trypillia culture. However, this is not taken seriously by most modern archeologists or professional historians anymore. It is considered a "myth of ethnogenesis". Since Trypillian culture was not literate, this is pure speculation, based on 'Culture-historical archaeology', which was known to be the dubious form of archeology from Imperial Russia and the Soviet Union (sometimes called "Russian Archeology", but also based on "Ethnos Theory").

The land of the Polans was at the crossroads of territories inhabited by different Eastern Slavic tribes (such as the Drevlians, Radimichs, Drehovians and Severians) and connected them all with water arteries. An important trade route, the Road from the Varangians to the Greeks, passed along the Dnieper through the land of the Polans and connected Northern Europe with the Black Sea and the Byzantine Empire. In the 9th and 10th centuries the Polans conducted well-developed arable land farming, cattle-breeding, hunting, fishing, wild-hive beekeeping and various handicrafts such as blacksmithing, casting, pottery, goldsmithing, etc. Thousands of (pre-Polan) kurgans, found by archaeologists in the Polan region, indicate that that land could support a relatively high population density. The Polans lived in small families in semi dug-outs ("earth-houses") and wore homespun clothes and modest jewellery. Before converting to Christianity, the inhabitants used to burn their dead and to erect kurgan-like embankments over them.

In the 860s, the Varangians (Vikings) arrived and organized a few successful military campaigns against the Byzantine Empire, which eventually defeated them and made peace with them, the Pechenegs and the Polochans.

The chronicles repeatedly note that socio-economic relations in the Polan communities were highly developed compared to the neighboring tribes. In the 880s Oleg of Novgorod conquered the land of the Polans.
The chronicles name the Polans among the (legendary) earlier founders of Kyiv (see Kyi, Shchek and Khoryv).

According to chronicalized legends, the largest cities of the eastern Polans were Kyiv, Pereiaslav, Rodnia, Vyshhorod, Bilhorod Kyivskyi (now Bilohorodka village at the Irpin river) and Kaniv. In the 10th century, the term "Polans" was virtually out of use, replaced by the name "Rus", with eastern Polans as a tribe being last mentioned in a chronicle of 944.

At one stage the Polanians were subjugated by the Khazars.

See also 
 Drevlians
 Severians
 List of Medieval Slavic tribes

References 

 

East Slavic tribes
Ethnic groups in Ukraine